Galeazzi is a surname. Notable people with the surname include:

Domenico Galeazzi (1647–1731), Italian painter
Giampiero Galeazzi (1946-2021), Italian competition rower, sport journalist, commentator and television personality
Lucia Galeazzi Galvani (1743–1788), Italian scientist
Lucilla Galeazzi (born 1950), Italian folk singer
Mara Galeazzi (born 1973), Italian ballet dancer
Marcelo Galeazzi (1966–2016), Argentine footballer
Ricardo Galeazzi (1866–1952), Italian orthopaedic surgeon
Riccardo Galeazzi-Lisi (1891–1968), Italian medical doctor

See also 
Galeazzi fracture, Bone fracture
Galeazzi test, also known as the Allis sign, is used to assess for hip dislocation